Juan Manuel Suárez del Valle (born 4 March 1966) is a former Spanish footballer who played as a midfielder.

Career
Juanma started his career at the age of 16, making his debut for Ensidesa on 4 April 1981 in a 6–2 loss against San Sebastián, Real Sociedad's B team. In 1983, Juanma joined Real Avilés, following Avilés' and Ensidesa's merger. In 1986, Juanma signed for Sporting Gijón, initially playing for the club's B team. On 17 May 1987, Juanma made his La Liga debut for Sporting, in a 1–1 draw against Mallorca. Juanma stayed with Sporting for six seasons, scoring one hat-trick in a 4–1 win against Celta Vigo on 27 April 1988, a match he also received a red card in. In 1992, after 9 league goals in 116 league appearances for Sporting, Juanma signed for Logroñés. Juanma spent three seasons at Logroñés, making 48 La Liga appearances, scoring three times. In 1995, Juanma signed for Segunda División B club Granada. Juanma stayed at Granada for two seasons, before re-signing for Real Avilés in 1997, before retiring in 1999.

Personal life
Juanma's son, Pelayo Suárez, is currently a defender for Sporting Gijón. Juanma played alongside his brother, Monchu, at Sporting.

References

1966 births
Living people
Spanish footballers
People from Gozón
Association football midfielders
CD Ensidesa players
Real Avilés CF footballers
Sporting de Gijón B players
Sporting de Gijón players
UD Logroñés players
Granada CF footballers
La Liga players
Segunda División B players